Argyria mesogramma is a moth in the family Crambidae. It was described by Harrison Gray Dyar Jr. in 1913. It is found in Brazil (Parana).

References

Argyriini
Moths described in 1913
Moths of South America